Ain el-Ghoubayeh (also spelled Ayn al-Ghubayah) is a mountainous village in the Byblos District of  Keserwan-Jbeil Governorate, Lebanon. It is 82 kilometers north of Beirut. Ain el-Ghoubayeh has an average elevation of 800 meters above sea level and a total land area of 64 hectares. Its inhabitants are predominantly Shia Muslims.

References

Populated places in Byblos District
Shia Muslim communities in Lebanon